Amaranthus sclerantoides is a species of plant in the family Amaranthaceae. It is endemic to Ecuador.

References

sclerantoides
Endemic flora of Ecuador
Least concern plants
Taxonomy articles created by Polbot